Orland Hills (formerly Westhaven) is a village in Cook County, Illinois, United States. Per the 2020 census, the population was 6,893.

Geography
Orland Hills is located between Orland Park and Tinley Park. Orland Hills has two lakes: Lake Ashbourne and Lake Lorin. It is also home to Kelly Park.

Demographics
As of the 2020 census there were 6,893 people, 2,386 households, and 1,804 families residing in the village. The racial makeup of the village was 73.73% White, 8.89% African American, 0.13% Native American, 4.92% Asian, 0.00% Pacific Islander, 3.89% from other races, and 8.44% from two or more races. Hispanic or Latino of any race were 12.39% of the population.

There were 2,386 households, out of which 56.87% had children under the age of 18 living with them, 62.62% were married couples living together, 10.52% had a female householder with no husband present, and 24.39% were non-families. 22.05% of all households were made up of individuals, and 4.95% had someone living alone who was 65 years of age or older. The average household size was 3.49 and the average family size was 2.96.

The village's age distribution consisted of 20.1% under the age of 18, 8.3% from 18 to 24, 28.5% from 25 to 44, 32.3% from 45 to 64, and 10.9% who were 65 years of age or older. The median age was 37.3 years. For every 100 females, there were 110.7 males. For every 100 females age 18 and over, there were 108.6 males.

The median income for a household in the village was $82,337, and the median income for a family was $100,000. Males had a median income of $56,938 versus $36,944 for females. The per capita income for the village was $35,688. About 10.0% of families and 12.4% of the population were below the poverty line, including 35.7% of those under age 18 and 6.0% of those age 65 or over.

Note: the US Census treats Hispanic/Latino as an ethnic category. This table excludes Latinos from the racial categories and assigns them to a separate category. Hispanics/Latinos can be of any race.

Government
As of 2023, Orland Hills is a part of Illinois' 6th Congressional District which is represented by democrat Sean Casten. Orland Hills has a village board with a mayor. The current mayor of Orland Hills is Kyle R. Hastings, Sr. Hastings has been the mayor of Orland Hills since 1993.

It is widely viewed that the Hastings family has a south suburban political dynasty with Hastings Sr as the mayor of Orland Hills, one son, Kyle Hastings II, is a trustee on the village board of Orland Hills. Hastings II is also widely viewed as the most likely successor to his father for the mayoral seat. Michael Hastings is a state senator from Illinois' 19th state senate district, who also briefly ran for the Illinois Secretary of State position in the 2022 elections, he later dropped out of the election. The Hastings family also has a daughter who sits of the board of Moraine Valley Community College, Kimberly Hastings. The family is also connected to numerous other political figures in the south suburbs.

As of 2023, Orland Hills will be represented by Tim Ozinga, a republican in the Illinois House of Representatives. Orland Hills is a part of the 37th legislative district.

Education
A majority of students from Orland Hills attend Victor J. Andrew High School (residents who live south of Meadowview Ave), while the rest attend Carl Sandburg High School (residents who live north of Meadowview Ave).

There are two elementary school districts that serve Orland Hills: Kirby School District 140 and the Orland School District 135.

Orland Hills is also home to Cardinal Joseph Bernadine Catholic School, or CJB for short. The school is run by the Archdioceses of Chicago.

Notable people
Michael E. Hastings, Illinois legislator and lawyer

References

External links
Village of Orland Hills official website

Villages in Illinois
Villages in Cook County, Illinois
Chicago metropolitan area
Populated places established in 1961
1961 establishments in Illinois